The Peel Sessions 1988–90 is a Bolt Thrower album consisting of three Peel Sessions. It is released on Strange Fruit: DEI 8118-2 in 1991 and recorded live in the studio. It is produced by Dale Griffin.

Track listing

The tracks 1 to 4 are from the first Peel session. Track 5 to 8 are from their second Peel session and the last four tracks are from the last Peel session.

This is the only recording of the track "Domination". The intro of the song was later used for "Prophet of Hatred".

Personnel
Bolt Thrower
 Alan West – vocals on tracks 1–4
 Karl Willetts – vocals on tracks 5–12
 Gavin Ward – guitars
 Barry Thomson – guitars
 Andrew Whale – drums
 Jo Bench – Bass

Production
 Dale Griffin - Producer
 Mike Walters - Engineering
 Mike Engles - Engineering
 F. Kay - Engineering
 Don Walker - Mastering

Bolt Thrower albums
Peel Sessions recordings
1991 live albums
1991 compilation albums